Marsha Blackburn (born 1952) is a U.S. Senator from Tennessee. Senator Blackburn may also refer to:

Joseph Clay Stiles Blackburn (1838–1918), U.S. Senator from Kentucky
W. Jasper Blackburn (1820–1899), Louisiana State Senate